Anaphosia extranea is a moth of the subfamily Arctiinae. It was described by Hubert Robert Debauche in 1938. It is found in the Democratic Republic of the Congo.

References

Moths described in 1938
Lithosiini
Insects of the Democratic Republic of the Congo
Moths of Africa
Endemic fauna of the Democratic Republic of the Congo